Clenleu is a commune in the Pas-de-Calais department in the Hauts-de-France region of France.

Geography
A village situated some 5 miles (8 km) northeast of Montreuil-sur-Mer on the D152 and D128 road junction.

Population

See also
Communes of the Pas-de-Calais department

References

Communes of Pas-de-Calais